Rear Admiral George Henry Strohsahl Jr. (May 24, 1937 – May 22, 2011) was a highly decorated Navy strike fighter and test pilot who flew missions in Vietnam.  Born in New Jersey and raised in Mystic, Connecticut, he rose to become commander of the Pacific Missile Test Center. Strohsahl spent 35 years in the U.S. Navy and was a 1959 honors graduate of the U.S. Naval Academy. He later earned a master's degree in Air-Space Physics from the Naval Postgraduate School and was designated a Material Professional. Strohsahl was the first naval aviator of his specialty selected for flag rank. He was awarded the Legion of Merit three times and also received the Distinguished Service Medal.

He portrayed the 's Air Boss, a position he actually held, in the 1980 film The Final Countdown starring Kirk Douglas and Martin Sheen.

After retiring from active duty, he was an executive manager for Boeing.

He died of cancer in 2011 and was interred at the United States Naval Academy Cemetery.

References

 Rear Adm. Strohsahl, big proponent of NBVC, dies
 George Henry Strohsahl, Jr. obituary

External links 
 

1937 births
2011 deaths
People from Mystic, Connecticut
United States Naval Academy alumni
Military personnel from New Jersey
United States Naval Aviators
United States Navy personnel of the Vietnam War
Naval Postgraduate School alumni
United States Navy admirals
Recipients of the Legion of Merit
Recipients of the Navy Distinguished Service Medal
Deaths from cancer
Burials at the United States Naval Academy Cemetery
American test pilots